Plum Valley may refer to a location in the United States:

 Plum Valley, Illinois, a census-designated place
 Plum Valley, Missouri, an extinct town
 Plum Valley Airport in Oregon

See also
Plum Branch (disambiguation)
Plum Creek (disambiguation)
Plum River